Gregory Scott was a British film actor of the silent era. He was born Gregory Scott Frances on 15 December 1879 in Sandy, Bedfordshire, England.

Selected filmography
 Enoch Arden (1914)
 The Harbour Lights (1914)
 In the Ranks (1914)
 Lawyer Quince (1914)
 She Stoops to Conquer (1914)
 Flying from Justice (1915)
 A Rogue's Wife (1915)
 The Answer (1916)
 The Green Orchard (1916)
 The Ware Case (1917)
 Not Negotiable (1918)
 The Gentleman Rider (1919)
 A Great Coup (1919)
 Trent's Last Case (1920)
 Kissing Cup's Race (1920)
 The Case of Lady Camber (1920)
 The Romance of a Movie Star (1920)
 A Great Coup (1920)
 The Loudwater Mystery (1921)
 A Sportsman's Wife (1921)
 In Full Cry (1921)
 The Penniless Millionaire (1921)
 The Green Caravan (1922)
 A Rogue in Love (1922)

References

External links

1879 births
Year of death unknown
English male film actors
English male silent film actors
People from Sandy, Bedfordshire
20th-century English male actors